Butterfly watching is a hobby concerned with the observation and study of butterflies. It also includes the "catch and release" of butterflies. There are clubs, handbooks, checklists, and festivals devoted to the activity.

The Canada Day and Fourth of July annual butterfly count, a census of species by butterfly watchers throughout North America, is an example of citizen science.

Equipment used 
 Low-power binoculars (7x35, for example), especially close-focus binoculars are helpful
 A butterfly field guide. Not all butterflies are readily identifiable from color photographs. The skippers, for example, are best identified from set specimens.
 A camera (optional)

Locations
A person can watch butterflies almost everywhere but some well-known butterfly-watching areas include Costa Rica, the Amazon Basin, and sub-Saharan Africa.

Counting butterflies 
Projects in Sweden, the United Kingdom, Finland, the Netherlands, North America, and other countries provide a framework for reporting butterfly sightings in an attempt to understand the factors that threaten or favor European butterflies.

See also 
 Butterfly gardening
 Butterfly field guides by region
 Lepidopterist

References 

 D’Amico G., Groppali R. & D’Amico N., 2011. Farfalle diurne pronube e fioriture nettarifere: segnalazioni per la Val Padana interna e indicazioni di profilo conservazionistico (Lepidoptera Hesperioidea, Papilionoidea). Bollettino della Società entomologica Italiana, 143 (3): 111–136.
 Dunkle, S. W. (2000). Dragonflies through binoculars: a field guide to dragonflies of North America. New York: Oxford University. 
 Glassberg, J. (1993). Butterflies through binoculars: a field guide to butterflies in the Boston, New York, Washington region. New York: Oxford University Press.   (pbk)
 Glassberg, J. (1999). Butterflies through binoculars: the East. New York: Oxford University Press. 
 Glassberg, J. (2001). Butterflies through binoculars: the West : a field guide to the butterflies of western North America. Oxford & New York: Oxford University Press. 
 Glassberg, J., Minno, M. C., & Calhoun, J. V. (2000). Butterflies through binoculars: Florida. New York: Oxford University Press. 
 Groppali R., D'Amico G. & Riccardi C. (2008). "Osservare gli insetti: farfalle e libellule del Parco Adda Sud. Atlante-guida per la fruizione della fauna minore nell'area protetta". Conoscere il Parco (Volume 6), Parco Adda Sud, Lodi, 206 pp. (http://www.parcoaddasud.it/tuttopubblicazioni.htm )

External links
eButterfly
North American Butterfly Association (NABA)
Butterflying to Amazonia
The Lepidopterists' Society
Carolina Butterfly Society
Butterflies of North Carolina
Massachusetts Butterfly Club (chapter of NABA)
Butterfly Watching Basics
The Mulberry Wing - Field notes of the New York City and North Jersey Butterfly Clubs.
Butterfly Conservation - The main UK organisation.
NABA South Texas, America's Butterfly Capital (chapter of NABA)
Butterflying in South Texas, America's Butterfly Capital
Butterflying in Mexico and Latin America

Watching
Observation hobbies
Lepidopterology